Galleh Dar (also Romanized as Galleh Dār and Galeh Dār; also known as Galleh Dār-e Bālā, Gilehdār, and Qal‘eh Dar) is a village in Simakan Rural District, in the Central District of Bavanat County, Fars Province, Iran. At the 2006 census, its population was 85, in 24 families.

References 

Populated places in Bavanat County